The Saxon-Bohemian Chalk Sandstone Region is a (relatively small)  natural region in south Saxony on the southern border with the Czech Republic. It forms part of the northern perimeter of the Bohemian Massif and comprises Saxon Switzerland, the German part of the Elbsandsteingebirge and the Zittau Hills, a small section of the Lusatian Mountains on German soil. Because the boundary between the Elbsandsteingebirge and the Lusatian Uplands is on Czech territory, the two natural regions are physically separated.

At the beginning of the 21st century the working group for Ecological Balance and Regional Character in the Saxon Academy of Sciences in Leipzig grouped all mountain and hill areas in the Saxon-Bohemian border region into a single geographical unit known as the Saxon Highlands and Uplands. This includes the Lusatian Mountains sandwiched between the Zittau Hills and Saxon Switzerland, which had been grouped by Meynen with the loess landscapes to the east and west into the natural region of Upper Lusatia; to the west the new major unit merges into the Ore Mountains and the Vogtland.

The Lusatian Mountains are not, however, built of chalk sandstone, but descend northwards and form the eastern part of the Saxon Uplands together with the 'real' chalk sandstone region.

Sub-divisions 

The Saxon-Bohemian Chalk Sandstone Region, according to Meynen, was divided as follows (in brackets: natural regions according to the BfN):

 43 (=D15) Saxon-Bohemian Chalk Sandstone Region (in its widest sense)
 430 Saxon Switzerland 
 431 Zittau Hills 
 (441 Lusatian Mountains)

See also 
 Saxon Highlands and Uplands
 Natural regions of Germany

References

General sources 

 BfN
 Map services
 Landscape fact files:
 Saxon Switzerland (excluding the Elbe Valley)
 Upper Elbe Valley
 Zittau Mountains
 (Lusatian Uplands)

Literature 
 Meynen, Emil (ed.): Handbuch der naturräumlichen Gliederung Deutschlands. Selbstverlag der Bundesanstalt für Landeskunde, Remagen 1953-1962 (Teil 1, enthält Lieferung 1-5), ISBN B0000BJ19E
 Meynen, Emil (ed.): Handbuch der naturräumlichen Gliederung Deutschlands. Selbstverlag der Bundesanstalt für Landeskunde, Remagen 1959-1962 (Teil 2, enthält Lieferung 6-9), ISBN B0000BJ19F

Natural regions of Saxony